This is a complete episode list for the 1974 NBC Saturday morning series Land of the Lost.

Series overview

Episodes

Season 1 (1974)

Season 2 (1975)

Season 3 (1976)

See also
 Land of the Lost (1974 TV series), the original children's television series created by Sid and Marty Krofft
 Land of the Lost characters and species
 Land of the Lost (1991 TV series), the 1991 remake of the 1974 series
 Land of the Lost (film), a 2009 film starring Will Ferrell based on the 1974 series

References

Land of the Lost
Land of the Lost